The Migros Museum of Contemporary Art (German: Migros Museum für Gegenwartskunst) is a museum for contemporary art in Zürich, Switzerland. The museum was founded in 1996

.

It is the successor to the Halle für Internationale neue Kunst, which existed from 1978 until 1981. It receives financing from the cooperative society Migros, which dedicates 1% of earnings, the so-called Kulturprozent to culture.

The museum was renovated between 2010 and 2012 and reopened on August 31, 2012, with the first Swiss solo exhibition by Ragnar Kjartansson. The museum has two floors with a total area of approximately 1300 m2. One floor is used to display the collection, the other is used for temporary exhibitions. The collection contains over 1300 works by 700 artists.

Exhibitions
Some artists who have been featured include:

References 

Museums in Zürich
Contemporary art galleries in Switzerland

Rein Wolfs (in German)